This is a list of mosques in Syria.

See also

 Islam in Syria
 Lists of mosques

References

Syria
 
Mosques